The Amalgamated Society of Woodcutting Machinists (ASWM) was a trade union representing sawyers in the United Kingdom.

The union was founded in 1866 as the Birmingham and District Mill Sawyers and Planing Machine Workers' Trade Society by a group of eighty workers.  From 1877, it aimed to recruit members across the country, changing its name to the "Amalgamated Society of Woodcutting Machinists", although it was often called the Mill Sawyers' Union.

Membership gradually grew, to 248 in 1875, and 692 in 1890, and several regional unions merged into it: the London Mill Sawyers and Wood Cutting Machinists' Society, the Scottish Woodcutting Machinemen's Society, and the Yorkshire United Steam Sawyers and Woodcutting Machinists' Society.  Early in the 1910s, it changed its name to the Amalgamated Society of Mill Sawyers and Woodcutting Machinists, then to the Amalgamated Society of Wood Cutting Machinists of Great Britain and Ireland, before returning to the ASWM name in 1919.

The union generally grew through the 20th-century, having 23,000 members by the 1970s.  In 1971, it merged with the National Union of Furniture Trade Operatives to form the Furniture, Timber and Allied Trades Union.

General Secretaries
1866: Joseph Wild
1877: Lees
 J. Sewell
 Thomas Park
1900s: W. J. Wentworth
1931: John MacKay
1934: James Lyno
1946: Jim Whittaker
1947: Thomas McAndrew
1960: Charles Stewart

References

Defunct trade unions of the United Kingdom
1866 establishments in the United Kingdom
Trade unions established in 1866
Trade unions disestablished in 1971
Timber industry trade unions
Trade unions based in Greater Manchester